The Xinzhong Park is a park in Songshan District, Taipei, Taiwan.

Transportation
The park is accessible within walking distance east from Songshan Airport Station of Taipei Metro.

See also
 List of parks in Taiwan

References

External link

Parks in Taipei